In diving and decompression, the oxygen window is the difference between the partial pressure of oxygen (PO2) in arterial blood and the PO2 in body tissues. It is caused by metabolic consumption of oxygen.

Description
The term "oxygen window" was first used by Albert R. Behnke in 1967. Behnke refers to early work by Momsen on "partial pressure vacancy" (PPV) where he used partial pressures of oxygen and helium as high as 2–3 ATA to create a maximal PPV. Behnke then goes on to describe "isobaric inert gas transport" or "inherent unsaturation" as termed by LeMessurier and Hills and separately by Hills,  who made their independent observations at the same time. Van Liew et al. also made a similar observation that they did not name at the time. The clinical significance of their work was later shown by Sass.

The oxygen window effect in decompression is described in diving medical texts and the limits reviewed by Van Liew et al. in 1993.

Van Liew et al. describe the measurements important to evaluating the oxygen window as well as simplify the "assumptions available for the existing complex anatomical and physiological situation to provide calculations, over a wide range of exposures, of the oxygen window".

Background
Oxygen is used to decrease the time needed for safe decompression in diving, but the practical consequences and benefits need further research. Decompression is still far from being an exact science, and divers when diving deep must make many decisions based on personal experience rather than scientific knowledge.

In technical diving, applying the oxygen window effect by using decompression gases with high PO2 increases decompression efficiency and allows shorter decompression stops. Reducing decompression time can be important to reduce time spent at shallow depths in open water (avoiding dangers such as water currents and boat traffic), and to reduce the physical stress imposed on the diver.

Mechanism
The oxygen window does not increase the rate of offgassing for a given concentration gradient of inert gas, but it reduces the risk of bubble formation and growth which depends on the total dissolved gas tension. Increased rate of offgassing is achieved by providing a larger gradient. The lower risk of bubble formation at a given gradient allows the increase of gradient without excessive risk of bubble formation. In other words, the larger oxygen window due to a higher oxygen partial pressure can allow the diver to decompress faster at a shallower stop at the same risk, or at the same rate at the same depth at a lower risk, or at an intermediate rate at an intermediate depth at an intermediate risk.

Application
Use of 100% oxygen is limited by oxygen toxicity at deeper depths. Convulsions are more likely when the PO2 exceeds . Technical divers use gas mixes with high PO2 in some sectors of the decompression schedule.

Where to add the high PO2 gas in the schedule depends on what limits of PO2 are accepted as safe, and on the diver's opinion on the level of added efficiency.

Nevertheless, much is still unknown about how long this extension should be and the level of decompression efficiency gained. At least four variables of decompression are relevant in discussing how long high PO2 decompression stops should be:
 Time needed for circulation and elimination of gas through the lungs;
 The vasoconstrictor effect (reduction of the size of blood vessels) of oxygen, reducing decompression efficiency when blood vessels start contracting;
 The threshold depth where the critical tissue compartments start off-gassing rather than in-gassing.
 Cumulative effect of acute oxygen toxicity.

See also

References

Further reading

External links

 good in-depth article

Underwater diving safety
Diving medicine